Seventh Tour of a Seventh Tour was a world tour conducted by British heavy metal band Iron Maiden in 1988, in support of their seventh studio album, Seventh Son of a Seventh Son. It was their last tour to feature the World Piece Tour-era lineup until 2000's  Brave New World Tour with guitarist Adrian Smith leaving the band in January 1990 and their first to include Michael Kenney (bassist Steve Harris' technician) on keyboards.

Background
In May, the group set out on a Seventh Tour of a Seventh Tour which saw them perform to more than two million people worldwide over seven months. After the blockbuster tour in North America, Iron Maiden were headliners of Monsters of Rock festivals in Europe for the very first time. They headlined stadiums and festivals in UK, Germany, Netherlands, Switzerland, France, Italy, Spain, Greece, Czechoslovakia and Hungary. In August, the band headlined the Monsters of Rock festival at Donington Park for the first time before a crowd of 107,000, the largest in Donington's history, and recorded a concert video, entitled Maiden England at the NEC, Birmingham in November. Stage set and equipment which has been taken by band was transported in dozen of trucks and was the most elaborate to date and one of the biggest in the world including over 200.000 watts of PA and over 1500 spot lamps.

To recreate the album's keyboards onstage, the group recruited Michael Kenney, Steve Harris' bass technician, to play the keys throughout the tour, during which he would perform the song "Seventh Son of a Seventh Son" on a forklift truck under the alias of "The Count" (for which he would wear a black cape and mask). Iron Maiden was apparently included in the Guinness Book Of World Records Museum in Las Vegas, NV. According to The Guinness book of Records (1990 ed. p. 155): "Largest PA system: On Aug 20th 1988 at the Castle Donington 'Monsters of Rock' Festival a total of 360 Turbosound cabinets offering a potential 523kW of programme power, formed the largest front-of-house PA. The average Sound Pressure Level at the mixing tower was 118dB, peaking at a maximum of 124dB during Iron Maiden's set. It took five days to set up the system."

Opening acts 
 Vinnie Vincent Invasion
 David Lee Roth
 Anthrax
 Megadeth
 Guns N' Roses
 Hurricane
 W.A.S.P.
 Helloween
 Killer Dwarfs
 Ossian
 Trust
 Great White
 L.A. Guns
 Metallica
 Backstreet Girls
 Frehley's Comet 
 Savatage
 Testament

Setlist
"Moonchild" (from Seventh Son of a Seventh Son, 1988)
"The Evil That Men Do" (from Seventh Son of a Seventh Son, 1988)
"The Prisoner" (from The Number of the Beast, 1982)
"Wrathchild" (From Killers, 1981) (Played from 17 August to 5 October)
"Still Life" (from Piece of Mind, 1983) (Added on 18 November)
"Die With Your Boots On" (from Piece of Mind, 1983) (Added on 18 November)
"Infinite Dreams" (from Seventh Son of a Seventh Son, 1988)
"The Trooper" (from Piece of Mind, 1983) (Replaced by "Killers" (From Killers, 1981) on 18 November)
"Can I Play with Madness" (from Seventh Son of a Seventh Son, 1988)
"Heaven Can Wait" (from Somewhere in Time, 1986)
"Wasted Years" (from Somewhere in Time, 1986)
"The Clairvoyant" (from Seventh Son of a Seventh Son, 1988)
"Seventh Son of a Seventh Son" (from Seventh Son of a Seventh Son, 1988)
"The Number of the Beast" (from The Number of the Beast, 1982)
"Hallowed Be Thy Name" (from The Number of the Beast, 1982)
"Iron Maiden" (from Iron Maiden, 1980)
"Run to the Hills" (from The Number of the Beast, 1982)
"22 Acacia Avenue" (from The Number of the Beast, 1982) (Played from 4 August to 10 September)
"2 Minutes to Midnight" (From Powerslave, 1984) (Dropped after 10 September)
"Running Free" (from Iron Maiden, 1980)
"Sanctuary" (from Iron Maiden, 1980) (Added on 20 August)

Tour dates

Reference

Festivals and other miscellaneous performances
This concert was a secret show under the name "Charlotte and the Harlots"
This concert was a part of "Monsters of Rock"

Cancelled and rescheduled dates
10 July 1988: Allentown, United States, Stabler Arena (Due to poor ticket sales.)
25 August 1988: Prague, Czechoslovakia, Letná Stadium (By the authorities.)

References

External links
Official website
Seventh Tour of a Seventh Tour Dates

Iron Maiden concert tours
1988 concert tours